Life Is All You Get is a 1997 German comedy film directed by Wolfgang Becker. It was entered into the 47th Berlin International Film Festival where it won an Honourable Mention. Joe Leydon of Variety praised the film as "an extremely engaging tale of life and love in a city where everything appears to be in a state of flux," and described it as "a smartly written and sharply observed comedy-drama. At its frequent best, pic has a fresh and larky charm that's reminiscent of fondly remembered French New Wave romances."

Cast
 Jürgen Vogel as Jan Nebel
 Christiane Paul as Vera
 Ricky Tomlinson as Buddy
 Meret Becker as Moni
 Christina Papamichou as Kristina
 Martina Gedeck as Lilo
 Armin Rohde as Harri
 Rebecca Hessing as Jenni
 Andrea Sawatzki as Sylvia
 Frank-Michael Köbe as Zivi 1 / Undercover Police Officer #1
 Rainer Werner as Zivi 2 / Undercover Police Officer #2
 Uwe Richter as Polizist 1 / Police Officer #1
 Frank Kessler as Polizist 2 / Police Officer #2
 Oliver Heschke as Polizist 3 / Police Officer #3

References

External links

1997 films
1997 comedy films
1990s German-language films
German comedy films
Films set in Berlin
Films directed by Wolfgang Becker (director, born 1954)
1990s German films